Alexander Duncan "Mac" MacWilliam Sr. (May 25, 1891 – August 13, 1966) was the mayor of Vero Beach, Florida from 1927 to 1935, from 1939 to 1947, and from 1949 to 1951, he also served in the Florida House of Representatives from Indian River County in the 1933, 1945, 1947, 1949 and 1951 sessions.

Life
MacWilliam was born in Edinburgh, Scotland, and immigrated with his family to Cleveland, Ohio, when he was 18.

During World War I, serving with the 313th Machine Gun Battalion, 80th Division at the Battle of Meuse-Argonne, MacWilliam was shot in both legs while rescuing a trapped and wounded soldier. He was also the victim of a mustard gas attack, and suffered continuing health problems because of it. His doctor mentioned to him that he was investing in land in Florida, and MacWilliam decided to join him. In 1919, he moved from Ohio to Vero Beach, and he went on to supervise the construction of the golf course at Riomar. He met Jeanette Flaherty at the golf course, and married her in 1920.

In 1927, he was elected mayor. He supported the proposal to split off Indian River County from St. Lucie County. MacWilliam established the Indian River Mosquito Control Board, and introduced height restrictions on buildings.

Legacy 
 The Indian River Golf Foundation awards the Alex MacWilliam Sr. Trophy in memory of MacWilliam annually.

References 

1891 births
1966 deaths
American designers
American landscape architects
United States Army personnel of World War I
Mayors of Vero Beach, Florida
Democratic Party members of the Florida House of Representatives
Politicians from Cleveland
Politicians from Edinburgh
Recipients of the Croix de Guerre 1914–1918 (France)
Scottish emigrants to the United States
20th-century American politicians
Place of birth missing